Rolling Rock Club is a private country club located on  along U.S. Route 30 about  SE of Pittsburgh, in Laughlintown, Pennsylvania, Ligonier Valley.

History
Rolling Rock Club was originally  of land owned by Judge Thomas Mellon, who left it to his son Richard Beatty Mellon, brother of Andrew Mellon and onetime president of Mellon Bank. Richard Beatty Mellon turned Rolling Rock into a rural retreat for his friends and family to hunt, fish, and ride. From this, it steadily developed into an establishment that, in addition to the usual country club necessities — swimming pool and golf course — also boasted stocked trout streams, duck ponds, game birds, and shooting ranges. The club also kept a pack of English fox hounds, raised pheasants, and ran the Gold Cup Steeplechase (from 1933 until 1983). R.B. Mellon left the estate to his son, Richard King Mellon, when he died in 1933.

Golf course

The golf course at Rolling Rock Club in Laughlintown, Pennsylvania, was designed by Donald Ross and was built as a nine-hole course in 1917. The club opened nine new holes, designed by Brian Silva, in May 1997. The course totals 6,176 yards from the back tees. With only two water hazards in the form of environmentally sensitive areas, there are plenty of sand bunkers. The greens are undulating, and the fairways are tree-lined.

The Hunt Stables
The Hunt Stables were designed by Pittsburgh architect Benno Janssen and originally built in 1921 to house 28 stalls, a tack room, a veterinarian's area, grooms' quarters, food storage, equipment rooms, and a great round room where trophies and ribbons were displayed. With an intent to preserve the landmark of its heritage, in 1984, the building was converted into private condominiums, preserving as much of the existing architecture as possible. Every unit has its own entrance and individual identity and is autonomous with respect to neighboring units. The private resort also features overnight accommodations.

References
Rolling Rock Row, in Time, April 12, 1937.
 Sports Illustrated, October 8, 1956
 MacLachlan, Cornelius & Filoni Architects, Inc.; www.mcfarchitects.com
 http://biography.yourdictionary.com/richard-king-mellon

Clubs and societies in Pennsylvania
Golf clubs and courses in Pennsylvania
Buildings and structures in Westmoreland County, Pennsylvania
1917 establishments in Pennsylvania
Sports venues completed in 1917